Cameron Rodriguez (born September 2, 1981), best known by his stage name CAM, is a Spanish-American hip-hop artist, songwriter, and producer from Los Angeles. He has been working on his debut album LOST since the end of 2010.  He released his first single "Conspiracy Theories" as a promo (not for sale) with great success. He was first associated with the group The Profe$$sionalz consisting of himself and Lujuanimus (Aaron Lujan) and Reebdog (Amit Jain). The group was formed while at school at Loyola Marymount University. CAM has been associated with singer/songwriters like Kevyn and Kande who also feature on several of CAM's tracks. CAM is now recording his album LOST at Plaza Productions Studio (Thousand Oaks, California) with sound engineer Stephen Tackett.

Early life
CAM, born Cameron Rodriguez, was born in Santa Monica, California on September 2, 1981. He graduated from Loyola High School in 1999 and Loyola Marymount University in 2003.

Career
After releasing several songs with his Profe$$sionalz group in 2002, he turned to a solo career after graduating from his university and taking some time off. He came back in 2010, starting work on his upcoming album LOST. He has released several singles as promos (not available for purchase or download) such as "Conspiracy Theories", "True Colors" featuring Kevyn, and "U Are My Universe".  CAM has been featured as a top ten artist of the future on many sites such as ReverbNation and newsletters most notably "MercuryStorm". The "MercuryStorm" was quoted as saying "Every newsletter I always rotate a few up & comers that I feel really have the potential to take things to the next level. Cam is definitely bringing heat to the game.  Check out bangers like "The King of the Castle" & "True Colors"!"  At the end of 2011, Cam was asked to submit an original track for the DirecTV special 3D television series Gone Til December which will be airing in mid-2013.  Most recently, CAM has been asked to feature a track on the upcoming Hunger Games sequel Catching Fire.

Discography
Studio albums
 LOST (Upcoming) (2012)

Mixtapes
 Three Kings (2002)

Singles

As lead artist
 "Conspiracy Theories" (2011)
 "Fire" featuring Kevyn & Kande (2011)
 "U Are My Universe" (2012)
 "True Colors" (2012)

References

External links
 reverbnation
 mercurystorm

1981 births
Living people
21st-century American male musicians
21st-century American rappers
American male rappers
Musicians from Santa Monica, California
Rappers from Los Angeles

pl:CAM